John R. Garner (born 9 January 1947) is an English professional golfer.

During his playing career, Garner won one European Tour event, when he defeated Neil Coles in the final of the Benson & Hedges Match Play Championship in 1972. He didn't win again until 1998 at the Senior Tournament of Champions on the European Seniors Tour.

Garner was a member of the 1971 and 1973 Ryder Cup teams. He made just one appearance in 1971, teaming up with Neil Coles in a four-ball match against Frank Beard and J. C. Snead; the Americans won 2 and 1. Garner did not play a single match in 1973.

Garner is currently the teaching professional at the Manukorihi Golf Club in Taranaki, New Zealand.

Professional wins (3)

European Tour wins (1)

Other wins (1)
1971 Coca-Cola Young Professionals' Championship

European Senior Tour wins (1)

Results in major championships

Note: Garner only played in The Open Championship.

CUT = missed the half-way cut (3rd round cut in 1968 and 1973 Open Championships) 
"T" indicates a tie for a place

Team appearances
Ryder Cup: 1971, 1973
Double Diamond International (representing England): 1971 (winners), 1972 (winners)

External links

Manukorihi Golf Club

English male golfers
European Tour golfers
European Senior Tour golfers
Ryder Cup competitors for Europe
Sportspeople from Preston, Lancashire
1947 births
Living people